D-War (Korean: 디워, released in North America as Dragon Wars: D-War), is a 2007 American-South Korean action-adventure fantasy film written and directed by Shim Hyung-rae, and starring Jason Behr, Amanda Brooks, Robert Forster, and Elizabeth Peña.

At the time of its release, it was the highest-budgeted South Korean film of all time. The film grossed $75 million worldwide and received generally negative reviews.

Plot
The story follows the adventures of Ethan Kendrick, charged in his childhood by the enigmatic Jack to protect the Yuh Yi Joo, an individual who had been born able to change an Imoogi chosen by heaven into a Celestial Dragon, from a corrupt Imoogi identified as "Buraki", who was prevented from obtaining it in the past by Ethan and Jack's previous incarnations. To this end, Jack gives Ethan a medallion formerly belonging to Ethan's previous incarnation Haram, and reveals that the reincarnated Yuh Yi Joo is Sarah Daniels, whom Ethan will find in Los Angeles.

15 years after this revelation, Buraki invades the city, bent on capturing Sarah; whereupon Ethan, now a television news anchor, rescues her, conveys the knowledge of her purpose, and attempts to save her from Buraki, during which they eventually regain the memories of their past lives. During the resulting chase, Buraki's "Atrox Army" enters the city and engages the United States Army, the United States Air Force, and the Los Angeles Police Department in battle. Here, the Atrox Army is shown to consist of black-armored, humanoid knight warriors; theropod-like cavalry called "Shaconnes"; small, winged Western dragons called "Bulcos"; and immense, slow-moving reptiles carrying rocket-launchers on their backs, identified in the dialogue as "Dawdlers". Despite losses, this army overwhelms the human forces, while Ethan and Sarah escape the city, but are subsequently captured by the Bulcos and taken to a menacing fortress in the midst of a darkened desert landscape. There, as Buraki emerges from the fortress to consume Sarah, Ethan's medallion unleashes power that destroys the Atrox Army. Ethan then attempts to prevent Buraki from consuming Sarah, but he is knocked away, whereupon the Good Imoogi, of whom the power in Sarah was to be given, emerges from the fortress and attacks Buraki. The two Imoogi, good and evil, engage each other in a duel that Buraki appears to win after seemingly snapping the Good Imoogi's neck. After this, Buraki again approaches Sarah, who finally offers herself willingly; but instead gives her power to the injured Good Imoogi who absorbs it. Sarah faints, and Buraki can do nothing as the Good Imoogi becomes the Celestial Dragon (Type: Lung Dragon), continuing the duel until it finally destroys Buraki with a blast of flames.

Ethan watches Sarah dissolve into a spirit form, and the Celestial Dragon permits her to speak to Ethan, whom she assures that they shall see each other again, and promises to "love...for all eternity"; then withdraws Sarah into its body and ascends into the sky, through the parting clouds to the heavens. Jack appears behind Ethan, reminding him that the two of them "have been given a great honor" to take part in this transformation, and vanishes. After whispering "Goodbye old man", Ethan walks away into the desert.

Cast
 Jason Behr as Ethan Kendrick
 Cody Arens as Young Ethan
 Amanda Brooks as Sarah Daniels, the holder of the Yeo-Yi-Ju
 Cheyenne Alexis Dean as Young Sarah
 Robert Forster as Jack, Ethan's mentor and Sarah's guardian
 Chris Mulkey as Agent Frank Pinsky, senior partner of an investigation
 Elizabeth Peña as Agent Linda Perez, a scientist employed by the FBI
 Craig Robinson as Bruce, Ethan's fellow-member in televised journalism
 Aimee Garcia as Brandy, Sarah's friend
 John Ales as Agent Judah Campbell, junior partner to Frank Pinsky
 Billy Gardell as Mr. Belafonte
 Holmes Osborne as Hypnotherapist 
 Geoff Pierson as Secretary of State 
 Derek Mears as Bounty Hunter 
 Retta as Receptionist Nurse
 Michael Shamus Wiles as Evil General 
 Hyun Jin as Haram, the previous incarnation of Ethan's soul
 Kyuho Moon as Young Haram
 Hyojin Ban as Narin, the previous incarnation of Sarah's soul
 Roberta Farkas (uncredited) as Narrator

Production
Originally titled Dragon Wars (and still referred to by this title in publicity material), D-War has a long production history in South Korea. The film was announced in 2001 by director Shim Hyung-rae as his follow-up project to 1999's Yonggary. The budget was set at 30 billion won (approximately US$35 million), but ultimately went over budget in order to create the various creatures in the film, with some outside estimation as high as $US75 million dollars. The DVD release confirmed that it did indeed cost US$99 million.

As with Yonggary, Shim opted for a mostly American cast. Veteran actor Robert Forster landed a pivotal role and Jason Behr and Amanda Brooks were cast as the two young leads.

The next three years were spent creating the creature effects, all of which were done in house by Shim's Younggu-Art Movies company.  The completed film premiered at the American Film Market in early 2007. The film was released in South Korea on 1 August 2007. In the U.S., the film was released on 14 September 2007 by Freestyle Releasing.

On 7 August 2007, South Korea's Munhwa Broadcasting Corporation (MBC) Morning Live TV Show broadcast the film's final scene on TV without the permission of the studio, causing a controversy. A few days later the Ministry of Culture and Tourism released a statement in which they said that the incident did not violate South Korean copyright laws.

Release

Theatrical
A 110-minute cut was shown at the American Film Market on 4 November 2006 and at the Berlin Film Market on 8 February 2007. The film's final cut was edited down to 92 minutes for its South Korean and American release, after getting feedback from preview screenings. The film was released in South Korea on 1 August 2007. Freestyle Releasing released the film to 2,277 in the United States on September 14, 2007. It was the first Korean film to receive a wide release in the U.S.

Reception

Box office
D-War set a record of grossing US$20.3 million in South Korea in its first five days of release. As of 1 September, the film has grossed US$44 million in Korea and another US$10 million in other countries, totaling a worldwide gross of US$54 million as of 16 September. In North America, the film grossed US$5 million on 2,275 screens in its opening weekend. As of 25 November 2007, the film has grossed US$10,977,721 in North America,

Since then, D-War has been released theatrically in Malaysia and China, both with moderate critical reaction. China was the only one to live up to the South Korean release record, spawning 3,000,000 admissions and a premiere including pop idol Libing Chen. The movie grossed an equivalent of less than $850,000 USD in Japan.

Critical response
The website's critics consensus reads: "Dragon Wars special effects can't make up for an unfocused script and stale acting.". The film scored a 33 out of 100 at Metacritic, based on nine reviews indicating "general unfavorable reviews".

Derek Elley of Variety, reviewing it at the Berlin Film Festival's market section, called it "visually entertaining, and superior to helmer Shim Hyung-rae's last monster movie (Yonggary in 1999)", while also saying the film had a "Z-grade, irony-free script," and "likely to end up the most expensive cult movie on DVD." The Hollywood Reporter's Frank Scheck said, "the CGI effects are undeniably impressive" but that "the laughable story line, risible dialogue and cheap humor ... seriously detract from the fun." Luke Y. Thompson in L.A. Weekly derided the film as one "for connoisseurs of the 'totally preposterous crap' school of fantasy cinema... You know who you are: You have all the Warlock sequels on Laserdisc [and] the complete Leprechaun series on DVD" and says it's "funnier when it tries to be serious than when it goes for the gag."

Within nine days of its South Korean release, D-War attracted five million viewers, setting a national box office record for an opening week. The seemingly positive reaction from the Korean population, as indicated by the movie's box office success in Korea, was widely attributed to the film's appeal to Korean nationalism; a logical impression drawn from Shim's message at the end of the Korean version of this film, "D-War and I will succeed in the world market without fail," accompanied by the Korean folk anthem, "Arirang."  However, despite box office success, D-Wars was far from critically acclaimed by either Korean critics or Korea's general public. Korean film critic Kim Bong-sok said, "They want it to be successful in the U.S. because it's Korean, not because it's good" and called the film "immature and poorly made" and "below criticism". Other reactions from Korean critics have been 
similar.

Sequel
In March 2016, it was announced that a sequel entitled D-War II: Mysteries of the Dragon would be co-financed with Japan's H&R Global Pictures. The film's release date is set for mid-2017.

References
 Dragreder Vs Venosnaker

External links
 
 
 
 
 
 "D-War" Bodycount

2007 films
2000s action drama films
2007 horror films
2000s thriller films
American fantasy adventure films
Giant monster films
Films about dragons
Films set in Los Angeles
Films shot in Los Angeles
English-language South Korean films
Films scored by Steve Jablonsky
Showbox films
2000s South Korean films
2007 drama films
2000s English-language films